Ralph Maynard Smith (27 June 1904 – 25 December 1964) was a British artist, writer and architect.

References 
 http://www.rmstrust.org.uk
 http://www.wolseleyfinearts.com/catalogues/RMS%20catalogue%2004.pdf

Further reading
Ralph Maynard Smith A Haunted Man. Painter – Writer – Architect

External links 
Ralph Maynard Smith Trust

1904 births
1964 deaths